Flassan is a commune in the Vaucluse department in the Provence-Alpes-Côte d'Azur region in southeastern France.

Geography
Flassan is located at the foot of Mont Ventoux.

Demography

See also
Communes of the Vaucluse department

References

Communes of Vaucluse